Guy Mountfort  (4 December 1905 – 23 April 2003) was an English advertising executive, amateur ornithologist and conservationist. He is known for writing the pioneering A Field Guide to the Birds of Britain and Europe, published in 1954.

Biography

Born in London, Mountfort was the writer of the 1954 A Field Guide to the Birds of Britain and Europe, with illustrations by Roger Tory Peterson and distribution maps by Philip Hollom. The book was the first to provide a portable, accurate, illustrated guide to essentially all birds likely to be seen in Britain, and its design influenced all subsequent field guides.

In 1961 he created the World Wide Fund for Nature (back then the World Wildlife Fund) with Victor Stolan, Sir Julian Huxley, Sir Peter Scott and Max Nicholson. In 1956 he led a n expedition to the Coto Donana with the resulting Book Portrait of a Wilderness illustrated by Eric Hosking. In 1963, he led a party of naturalists and including Huxley, George Shannon James Ferguson-Lees and D. Ian M. Wallace which made the first ornithological expedition to Azraq in Jordan. The expedition's recommendations eventually led to the creation of the Azraq Wetland Reserve and other protected areas. Papers from the expedition are in the United Kingdom's National Archives. He was appointed an OBE in 1970, for services to ornithology. In 1972 he led the campaign to save the Bengal tiger, persuading Indira Gandhi to create nine tiger reserves in India, with eight others in Nepal and Bangladesh.

Bibliography

 The Hawfinch (1957) New Naturalist Monograph No.15. Collins: London.
 Portrait of a Wilderness: The story of the Coto Doñana Expeditions (1958) Hutchinson: London.
 2nd edition (1968) David & Charles: Newton Abbott. 
 Portrait of a River: the wildlife of the Danube from the Black Sea to Budapest (1962) Hutchinson: London.
 Portrait of a Desert: the story of an expedition to Jordan (1965) Collins: London.
 The Vanishing Jungle: the story of the World Wildlife Fund Expeditions to Pakistan (1969) Collins: London.
 Tigers (1973) David & Charles: Newton Abbott. 
 So Small a World (1974) Hutchinson: London. 
 Back from the Brink – Successes in wildlife conservation (1978) Hutchinson: London. 
 Saving the Tiger (1981) Michael Joseph: London. 
 A field guide to the birds of Britain and Europe by Roger Peterson, Guy Mountfort, P.A.D. Hollom. Collins, 1954
 1965 edition: revised and enlarged in collaboration with I.J. Ferguson-Lees and D.I.M. Wallace
 1971 impression:  
 2004 edition: 
 With a foreword by Sir Peter Scott
 Dedicated: "For Anna, Paul, Oliver and Stephen, who one day will know why Grandpa thought the protection of wildlife so important for their future."
Wild India – The Wildlife and Landscapes of India by Guy Mountfort, Hashim Tyabji and Gerald Cubitt, New Holland Publishers – 2007 – 3rd Edition:

References

External links
Guardian obituary
 Guy Mountfort, Julian Huxley and others started WWF

1905 births
2003 deaths
Scientists from London
English ornithologists
New Naturalist writers
Officers of the Order of the British Empire
20th-century British zoologists